Anderson West Township is a township in McDonald County, in the U.S. state of Missouri.

Anderson West Township takes its name from the town of Anderson, Missouri.

References

Townships in Missouri
Townships in McDonald County, Missouri